The Audi Pop.Up Next is a conceptual unmanned flying electric vehicle that can move both on the ground and through the air of the joint development of the German automaker Audi AG, the Airbus company, and the design company Italdesign Giugiaro. It was first presented at the Geneva Motor Show in 2018.

See also 
 Airbus CityAirbus
 Audi Aicon
 Audi e-tron family

References

External links

 audi-mediacenter.com Audi, Italdesign and Airbus combine self-driving car and passenger drone
 italdesign.it POP.UP NEXT
 airbus.com Airbus and Audi partner to provide air & ground urban mobility services

Roadable aircraft
Electric concept cars
Pop.Up Next